Matteo Gentili (born 21 August 1989) is an Italian footballer who plays as a defender for A.C. Prato.

He represented Italy at the 2008 UEFA European Under-19 Football Championship, where they came second, and at the 2009 FIFA U-20 World Cup.

Career

Atalanta and loans
Born in Viareggio, Tuscany, Gentili was signed by Atalanta B.C. from Polisportiva Margine Coperta in 2004 in a temporary deal, along with Michele Marconi, Leonardo Manni and Daniele Lonetti. In the next season he was signed definitely from the Massa e Cozzile based side. He was promoted to Atalanta B.C.'s Primavera U19 reserve team in 2006.

In 2008, he left Atalanta for another Lombard club Pergocrema. Gentili made his professional debut in the Italian Cup, However, he failed to play any game in the league nor in the league cup.

In the next season he was transferred to another Lombard club Varese, also in the same level as Pergocrema. He won promotion to Serie B with Varese in June 2010.

Atalanta kept Gentili for 2010–11 Serie B season, however he only played once for the champions.

In July 2011 he left the Serie A club for the third level side Spezia, but had an operation in his right ankle in the same month. Gentili won promotion to Serie B again as one of the group stage winner of the third level. The team also won 2012 Lega Pro Prime Division Supercup, a tournament between the two winners of the two groups of that level. However, he was not feature in the line-up nor on the bench of the matches. Gentili did featured for Spezia in the finals of the league up as an unused bench, which the team was the winner.

On 28 August 2012 he left for Serie B struggler Vicenza which relegated in the last season but re-admitted to Serie B due to the expulsion of Lecce.

Reggina
On 2 September 2013 Gentili was signed by Serie B club Reggina in a co-ownership deal for a peppercorn fee.

Vicenza
On 31 January 2014 he left for Vicenza in a -year contract (re-sold from Atalanta in another co-ownership deal for a peppercorn fee of €250). In June 2014 Vicenza acquired the remaining 50% registration rights of Gentili, from Atalanta for free.

In December 2015 Gentili was released by the Veneto club.

Carrarese
On 14 February 2017 Gentili was signed by Carrarese.

FC Pecciolese
On 24 January 2019, Gentili officially signed with FC Pecciolese 1936.

Honours

Club
Atalanta
 Serie B: 2010–11

Spezia
 Lega Pro Prima Divisione Group Stage Winner: 2011–12
 Coppa Italia Lega Pro: 2011–12

Varese
 Lega Pro Prima Divisione Promotion playoffs: 2009–10

References

External links
 National Team Statistics from FIGC.it 
 Lega Serie B Profile 
 
 

1989 births
Living people
Italian footballers
Italy youth international footballers
Atalanta B.C. players
U.S. Pergolettese 1932 players
S.S.D. Varese Calcio players
Spezia Calcio players
L.R. Vicenza players
Reggina 1914 players
Carrarese Calcio players
A.C. Prato players
Serie B players
Serie C players
Serie D players
Association football defenders
People from Viareggio
Sportspeople from the Province of Lucca
Footballers from Tuscany